The Morrison Natural History Museum is a natural history museum located in Morrison, Colorado.  The exhibits include several dinosaur fossils that were found nearby. Hands-on exhibits are designed to appeal to both children and adults, scientists and non-scientists.

History

The Museum opened in 1989 and has been operated by the Town of
Morrison since 1995.  Financial support comes from visitor's admission
fees, gift shop sales, grants, and private donations.

Exhibits

On the lower level, the Museum houses exhibits devoted to local
paleontology and Jurassic fossils.  On the upper level,
exhibits focus on Cretaceous and Cenozoic fossils.  A rock
garden and fossil dig pit are found outside the building.

Notable displays include skulls of Tyrannosaurus, Triceratops,
and Tylosaurus, remains of skeletons of Stegosaurus and
Pteranodon, and infant dinosaur tracks.  Live reptiles and
amphibians are also on display.

The Museum includes a paleontology lab where fossils are prepared for
exhibits and scientific research.

References

External links
 Museum's website

Dinosaur museums in the United States
Natural history museums in Colorado
Science museums in Colorado
Museums in Jefferson County, Colorado
Paleontology in Colorado